Anti-clerical art is a genre of art portraying clergy, especially Roman Catholic clergy, in unflattering contexts. It was especially popular in France during the second half of the 19th century, at a time that the anti-clerical message suited the prevailing political mood. Typical paintings show cardinals in their bright red robes engaging in unseemly activities within their lavish private quarters.

Nineteenth and early twentieth century artists known for their anti-clerical art include Francesco Brunery, Marcel Brunery, Georges Croegaert, Charles Édouard Delort, Jehan Georges Vibert, Jules Benoit-Levy, Adolphe Henri Laissement and Eduardo Zamacois y Zabala.

See also
 Anti-Catholicism
 Anti-clericalism

References

 Hook, Philip and Mark Poltimore, Popular 19th century painting, a dictionary of European genre painters, Woodbridge, Suffolk, Antique Collectors’ Club Ltd, 1985.

Examples of anti-clerical art

External links

 
Visual arts genres